Deepak Kumar may refer to:

 Deepak Kumar (historian) (born 1952), Indian historian
 Deepak Kumar (sport shooter) (born 1987), Indian sport shooter
 Deepak Kumar (physicist) (1946–2016), Indian condensed matter physicist and professor